Fatih Sultan Mehmet Anatolian High School is a four-year Anatolian High School located in Yalova, Turkey. The primary language of instruction is Turkish. The secondary foreign languages are German and English.

See also
 List of high schools in Turkey

References
 Yalova Fatih Sultan Mehmet Anadolu Lisesi Official Website - ''

External links
 Official Website

High schools in Yalova
Educational institutions established in 1994
Buildings and structures in Yalova
Buildings and structures in Yalova Province
1994 establishments in Turkey
Anatolian High Schools